Government Secondary School, Afikpo (GSSA) is a boys' high school located in Afikpo, a town in Ebonyi State in the former Eastern Region of Nigeria, the part of Nigeria that attempted to secede as the independent state of Biafra in the late 1960s. The Nigerian Civil War was Nigeria's ultimately successful attempt to reintegrate Biafra forcibly into the larger Nigerian polity. GSSA was one of the best of the antebellum “leadership academies” of Nigeria until the war and its aftermath.

History
GSSA was established in 1952 by Charles W. Low.

The first Principal was Charles W. Low, an Australian.

Academics
GSSA was established as an elitist school.  The school has continued to be one of the best secondary schools in Nigeria. All students are required to complete a number of core courses in the arts and sciences. Its students constantly achieved high scores in examination results at SSCE, O-Level and A-Level.

Sports and extra-curricular activities
Students of the school also participate in athletics and sports like, cricket, hockey, handball and football (soccer).

The school also has an Officer Cadet Corps that offers instruction in adventure training, camping and field drills.

School houses
The various houses to which students are assigned upon admission are:

Afikpo House
Akabuogu House
Charles Low House
Ibiam House
Ibi Mboto House
Niger House
Okpara House
Ramat House
School House

Notable alumni
 Chinweizu, pan-African philosopher
 Okwui Enwezor, curator, scholar.
 Lieutenant Commander Lawrence Ewa (Lorenzo), 1985 set. naval officer based in Lagos
 Emmanuel Isu, formal gubernatorial aspirant Ebonyi state
 Anyaoha Samuel Ndubuisi, 1999 set Communication Engineer; Standards Organisation of Nigeria
 John Nwangwu, public health doctor
 Ikenna Okike (CIPD) class of 1999, renowned UK trained human capital development specialist
 Iké Udé, photographer, performance artist, author and publisher
 Dave Umahi, politician
 Justice Oko Orji (DJ Slam), 1998 set - Marine Engineer, Naval Officer (Nigerian Navy)

External links
GSSA Alumni Association Website

References

Secondary schools in Nigeria
Boys' schools in Nigeria
Education in Ebonyi State
Educational institutions established in 1952
1952 establishments in Nigeria
Government schools in Nigeria